Karur Junction railway station (Code: KRR) is a junction station located in the city of Karur in the Indian state of Tamil Nadu. It is situated along with Erode and Tiruchirapalli. The station is a junction for incoming trains from Tiruchirappalli,Salem and Dindigul towards Jolarpettai–Chennai line through .

History 
It was the first railway station in India to have a broad-gauge track. It was installed in the late 1860s, in a period even when all Indian railway stations, including Mumbai, Delhi, Kolkata and Chennai, were on narrow gauge.

A  broad gauge line linking the station to Salem via  was opened in 2014. The station is a part of the Salem railway division of the Southern Railways. Karur is one of the List 'A' class junction in Salem division and one of the top revenue junctions in Southern Railways. Indian Railways has proposed doubling of Salem-Karur-Dindigul and Erode-Karur Line in the 2020 budget.

Lines
Four single BG electric lines branch out from the Junction:

 BG Single Electric Line Towards Salem Via Namakkal
 BG Single Electric Line Towards Dindigul
 BG Single Electric Line Towards Erode Via Kodumudi
 BG Single Electric Line Towards Tiruchirappalli Via Kulithalai

Platform layouts
 Number of platforms : 05
 RPF station       : Yes (at first platform)
 Retiring room    : Yes (both AC and Non-AC at Platform 1)
 Rest rooms       : Yes (at platforms 1,2 & 3)
 Canteen            : Yes (4 at platform 1 and 1 at platform 2)
 Tracks               : 07
 Platform 1 : Express/Superfast trains towards Erode,Chennai, Trichy and Madurai
 Platform 2 : Passenger trains and few weekly trains
 Platform 3 : Express trains towards Erode, Madurai and Trichy,Palakkad
 Platform 4 : Express trains towards Salem,Bangalore and Madurai and for freight trains
 Platform 5 : Passenger trains towards Salem,Bangalore and halting for freight trains

Incidents
 About 40 farmers in the district who had parted with their lands for the Salem–Karur BG line project filed a petition seeking adequate compensation as directed by the court.
 Six children, aged under 7 years old and a teacher travelling in a school van had a miraculous escape when their vehicle hit a slowing train at an unmanned level crossing at Kallumadai near the station in February 2014.

References

External links

Salem railway division
Railway stations in Karur district
Railway junction stations in Tamil Nadu
Karur